Schismatogobius fuligimentus is a species of freshwater goby endemic to New Caledonia, where it is found in shallow, slow-moving streams with gravel substrates at altitudes up to , although it is suspected of being amphidromous.

It is a slender, generally cylindrical goby. It is generally yellow with brown or black markings and displays sexual dimorphism; the underside of the head is yellow in males, black in females. It can be distinguished from all its congeners by having a lower number (13 or 14) of rays in the pectoral fins.

References

Schismatogobius
Fish described in 2001